The 4th Lagos State House of Assembly is the legislative branch of the Lagos State Government inaugurated on June 2, 1999, and the assembly ran its course till May 30, 2003. 
The assembly was unicameral with 41 representatives elected from each constituencies of the state.
The Speaker of the 6th Legislative Assembly was Rt. Hon Adeleke Mamora and the Deputy speaker was Hon. Adetoun Adediran.
The 5th Assembly was inaugurated on June 2, 2003, with the emergence of  Adeyemi Ikuforiji as Speaker.

References

1979 establishments in Nigeria
State lower houses in Nigeria
Lagos State House of Assembly